K. Wah International Holdings Limited, also abbreviated as KWIH, is a property developer in Hong Kong and the listed property arm of the K. Wah Group. Along with its subsidiaries, the Group is principally engaged in property development and investment in Hong Kong, Mainland China and Singapore. It was founded and remains controlled by tycoon Lui Che-woo.

KWIH encompasses a portfolio of residential developments, Grade-A office towers, retail spaces, hotels and serviced apartments.

Until July 2017, the group operated the Anderson Road Quarry, above Sau Mau Ping, supplying aggregate to Hong Kong for 50 years, and highly visible from much of Kowloon and Hong Kong. It also contributed to the rehabilitation of the site, which is now being developed for residence.

KWIH is a constituent stock of the Hang Seng Composite MidCap Index and MSCI China Small Cap Index. K Wah also holds a 3.8% stake in Galaxy Entertainment, one of the largest Macau gaming operators.

References

External links 
 
Google Finance profile

Companies listed on the Hong Kong Stock Exchange
Land developers of Hong Kong
Companies with year of establishment missing